David Frič (born 17 February 1983), is a Czech futsal player who plays for Slov-Matic Bratislava and the Czech Republic national futsal team.

References

External links
UEFA profile
Futsalplanet profile

1983 births
Living people
Czech men's futsal players
Sportspeople from Kladno